Gustavo di Mauro Vagenin (born 14 November 1991),  known as Gustavo, is a Brazilian professional footballer who plays for Iranian club Tractor SC as an winger. He has competed professionally in four countries apart from his own, mainly Italy.

Club career
Gustavo signed a two-year contract with Novara on 18 July 2014. On 2 February 2015 Gustavo and Manconi were signed by Lecce in temporary deals, with Luigi Della Rocca moved to Novara.

On 16 September 2015, he was signed by Messina.

On 5 March 2020, Gustavo rejoined Romanian club Universitatea Craiova.

On 10 August 2020, Gustavo signed by Ajman Club.

International career
Gustavo received call-up to Italy Universiade in 2013.

Honours
Salernitana
Lega Pro Seconda Divisione: 2012–13
Serie D: 2011–12
Coppa Italia Serie C: 2013–14

Universitatea Craiova
Cupa României: 2017–18
Supercupa României: 2021

Individual
Gazeta Sporturilor Romania Player of the Month: February 2022

References

External links

1991 births
Living people
Footballers from São Paulo
Association football midfielders
Brazilian footballers
Brazilian expatriate footballers
Serie C players
UAE Pro League players
U.S. Salernitana 1919 players
Novara F.C. players
U.S. Lecce players
A.C.R. Messina players
Liga I players
CS Universitatea Craiova players
China League One players
Liaoning F.C. players
Ajman Club players
Persian Gulf Pro League players
Tractor S.C. players
Brazilian people of Italian descent
Expatriate footballers in Italy
Brazilian expatriate sportspeople in Italy
Expatriate footballers in Romania
Brazilian expatriate sportspeople in Romania
Expatriate footballers in China
Brazilian expatriate sportspeople in China
Expatriate footballers in the United Arab Emirates
Brazilian expatriate sportspeople in the United Arab Emirates
Brazilian expatriate sportspeople in Iran